The men's Greco-Roman 66 kilograms is a competition featured at the 2005 World Wrestling Championships, and was held at the László Papp Budapest Sports Arena in Budapest, Hungary on 1 October 2005.

Results
Legend
C — Won by 3 cautions given to the opponent
F — Won by fall
WO — Won by walkover

Finals

Top half

Section 1

Section 2

Bottom half

Section 3

Section 4

Repechage

 Husamaddin Rajabov of Azerbaijan originally won the silver medal, but was disqualified after he tested positive for doping. Kim Min-chul was upgraded to the silver medal and Kim Kum-chol was raised to third and took the bronze medal.

References

Men's Greco-Roman 66 kg